Gremuchy Klyuch is a rural locality (a village) in Andreyevsky Selsoviet, Ilishevsky District, Bashkortostan, Russia. The population was 64 as of 2010.

Geography 
It is located 33 km from Verkhneyarkeyevo and 3 km from Andreyevka.

References 

Rural localities in Ilishevsky District